The Rutherford House is a historic building and museum in Edmonton, Alberta, Canada.

Rutherford House may also refer to:

Buildings

United States
Dr. Hiram Rutherford House and Office, Oakland, Illinois
Otto and Verdell Rutherford House, Portland, Oregon
Fair-Rutherford and Rutherford Houses, Columbia, South Carolina